"With All My Heart" is an English-language version, first recorded by Jodie Sands in 1957, of the French song "Gondolier" by Dalida.

With All My Heart may also refer to:

With All My Heart (Frankie Laine album) or the title song, 1955
With All My Heart (Harvey Mason album), 2004
With All My Heart (Romanz album) or the title song, 2012
With All My Heart, an album by Gogi Grant, 2009
"With All My Heart", a song by Dionne Warwick from Why We Sing, 2008
"With All My Heart", a song by Dream Street from the film The Biggest Fan, 2005